No More Lies – Dance of Death Souvenir EP is a studio EP by British heavy metal band Iron Maiden, released on 29 March 2004.

This EP was released as a "thank you" to fans, packaged in a box containing a free sweatband. Besides the studio version of "No More Lies", taken from the 2003 album Dance of Death, it also contains two alternate versions of songs from the same album: an orchestral version of "Paschendale" and the original electric version of "Journeyman" (not the acoustic album version). The EP also contains a hidden bonus track, an alternative version "Age of Innocence" (retitled as "Age of Innocence... How Old?") with drummer Nicko McBrain on vocals.

Track listing

Notes
 "Journeyman" ends after 7:06. There's silence for six minutes and six seconds before the hidden track "Age of Innocence... How Old?" starts at 13:12. It was written by Dave Murray and Steve Harris, with drummer Nicko McBrain on vocals.
 Includes enhanced video track for "No More Lies", recorded during the Dance of Death World Tour in 2004.

Chart positions

Personnel
Production and performance credits are adapted from the EP liner notes.
Iron Maiden
Bruce Dickinson - lead vocals
Dave Murray - guitar
Adrian Smith - guitar
Janick Gers - guitar
Steve Harris - bass, co-producer
Nicko McBrain - drums, lead vocals on "Age of Innocence (How Old?)"
Production
Kevin Shirley – producer, mixing
Matthew Amos – video editor ("No More Lies")
Ross Halfin – photography
Simon Fowler – photography
Lawrence Watson – photography
Mick Hutson – photography

References 

2004 EPs
Iron Maiden EPs
EMI Records EPs
Heavy metal EPs